Czech philosophy, has often eschewed "pure" speculative philosophy, emerging rather in the course of intellectual debates in the fields of education (e.g. Jan Amos Komenský), art (e.g. Karel Teige), literature (e.g. Milan Kundera), and especially politics (e.g. Tomáš Garrigue Masaryk, Karel Kosík, Ivan Sviták, Václav Havel). A source drawing from literature, however, distinguished the Czech national philosophy from the speculative tradition of German thought, citing that it emerged from folk wisdom and peasant reasoning.

Masaryk is credited for introducing the epistemological problem into the modern Czech philosophy, which in turn influenced the discourse on symbol and symbolization. Czech philosophers have also played a central role in the development of phenomenology, whose German-speaking founder Edmund Husserl was born in the Czech lands. Czechs Jan Patočka and Václav Bělohradský would later make important contributions to phenomenological thought.

Positivism became an important and dominant trend of modern Czech philosophy, eclipsing herbatianism , in what is explained as a collective "post-revolutionary" thinking characterized by an attempt to open a window to Europe in order to eliminate traces of philosophical provincialism.

References

 
Philosophy
Czech literature